Joseph-François Armand (14 December 1820 – 1 January 1903) was a member of the Senate of Canada. Born Joseph-Flavien Armand in Rivière-des-Prairies, Lower Canada, he was a farmer before entering politics.  In 1858, he was elected to the Legislative Council of the Province of Canada in the Alma division and served until 1867. A Conservative, he was appointed to the Senate on 23 October 1867 by a royal proclamation of Queen Victoria following Canadian Confederation earlier that year. He represented the senatorial division of Repentigny, Quebec until his death.

External links 

1820 births
1903 deaths
Canadian senators from Quebec
Conservative Party of Canada (1867–1942) senators
Members of the Legislative Council of the Province of Canada
People from Rivière-des-Prairies–Pointe-aux-Trembles